Aegomorphus piperatus is a species of beetle in the family Cerambycidae. It was described by Gahan in 1892.

References

Aegomorphus
Beetles described in 1892